Sweet Weaponry is the first studio album by the pop punk band Cruiserweight.

"To Be Quite Honest" is featured on the video game 'Saints Row', on the radio station 89.0 Generation X.

Track listing
"Vermont"
"Goodbye Daily Sadness" - 3:21
"At the End of the Tunnel There is Always a Shining Light"
"Passible" - 1:48
"This Ain't No Beach Party" - 3:27
"Phantom Rider" - 4:20
"To Be Quite Honest" - 3:41
"Vacation/Vacate" - 
"Dearest Drew"
"Operation Eyes Closed"
"Permanent Things"
"There You Are"
"Have You Had One of Those Days?" - 3:13

Personnel
Stella Maxwell - Lead vocals
David Hawkins - Bass
Urny Maxwell - Guitar
Yogi Maxwell - Drums

2005 albums
Cruiserweight (band) albums
Doghouse Records albums